The Belmond Royal Scotsman is a Scottish overnight luxury train, started in 1985 by GS&WR (Great Scottish and Western Railway Co.), and run since 2005 by Belmond Ltd. Its itineraries include 2, 3, 4, 5 or 7-night journeys around the Scottish Highlands, visiting castles, distilleries and historic sites. Once each year, it also makes a 7-night journey around the whole of Great Britain.

Train's history 

The first train was composed of Mark 1 sleeping cars and three vintage dining and lounge carriages. After the inauguration of the current train set in 1989, the vintage coaches have kept on running as the Queen of Scots charter train.

For the second train batch the train's former owner acquired Pullman cars, which were built in 1960 by Metropolitan Cammell for the East Coast Main Line. This train consisted of four sleeping cars, two dining cars, and one observation car.

The train's two dining cars have been replaced over the years. Dining Car 1, which used to be a Gresley kitchen car, was damaged in a shunting incident on depot and, as a wooden (Teak) bodied vehicle was deemed unsafe to continue passenger operations, it was withdrawn from mainline service. It was followed in 1992 by Pullman car Raven, acquired at the same time as the others in the train. Dining Car 2 used to be 99131, an ex-LNER SC1999 coach named Victory. It was replaced by the Pullman car Swift, which was acquired in 2011 and converted by Assenta Rail in Scotland.

Two former Mark 3 sleeping cars were added to the train in 1997 as service carriages, replacing two Mk1 coaches (99987 & 99966). One of them has also got double sleeping cabins.

Belmond acquired another Pullman coach in 2015 from CRRES (West Coast Railway Co Ltd) and again employed Assenta Rail to undertake outfitting and project management in order to create "State car - SPA". After provisional mechanical and body works at CRRES the coach was shipped to Mivan Marine in Antrim, where it was outfitted with two Bamford SPA rooms and 2 additional bedrooms (1 PRM Twin and 1 Double) with inter-connection. Upon completion the carriage was taken back to CRRES for final mechanical works and entry into the rolling stock library as 99337. The carriage entered service in September 2016.

In March 2023 the new accommodation category Grand Suite was announced, being available from May 2024. Similar to the namesakes of the Venice-Simplon Orient Express, the two compartments will feature double beds and a drawing saloon with a sofa. They will be located together with another double cabin in the carriage.

Current train fleet

The train length is   without locos.

Haulage

Until 2015, the Royal Scotsman was hauled by West Coast Railways, usually using Class 37, Class 47 or Class 57 diesel locomotives.

For the 2016 season, the haulage contract was taken over by GB Railfreight. Two of their class 66 locomotives - 66743 and 66746 - are being dedicated to the train. These were repainted into Belmond Royal Scotsman maroon livery with appropriate decals in April/May 2016, the work being carried out by Arlington Fleet Services at Eastleigh Works in Hampshire. 66746 appeared first, being released on 11 April with 66743 following on 30 May.

See also
 The Jacobite

References

External links 

 
 http://www.assentarail.co.uk

Named passenger trains of British Rail
Night trains of the United Kingdom